The Dos Rios AVA is an American Viticultural Area located in northern Mendocino County, California.  The appellation is located near the confluence of the Eel River and the Middle Fork of the Eel River. The name of the appellation is Spanish for "two rivers".  The location would have a warm climate if not for constant breezes from the Pacific Ocean.  The soil in Dos Rios is more infertile than other regions in the county.  Only one winery, Vin de Tevis, currently operates within the boundaries of the AVA.

See also
Mendocino County wine

References

External links
 Dos Rios AVA: Wine-Searcher

American Viticultural Areas
American Viticultural Areas of California
American Viticultural Areas of Mendocino County, California
2005 establishments in California